Ahmed Fouad Aly (born 30 June 1961) is an Egyptian weightlifter. He competed in the men's middleweight event at the 1984 Summer Olympics.

References

External links

1961 births
Living people
Egyptian male weightlifters
Olympic weightlifters of Egypt
Weightlifters at the 1984 Summer Olympics
Place of birth missing (living people)
20th-century Egyptian people